Valeria Milova (born 13 March 1988) is an Estonian dancer and choreographer. She is best known for her role as a professional dancer on the Irish and Turkish versions of Dancing with the Stars.

Career 
Milova started dancing at the age of eight. She is a former Estonian national hip hop dancing champion and has represented her country at the World and European Latin-American Championships. She has also been a finalist in the IDSF Amateur European Union Latin Championship and WDSF World Showdance Latin Championship in 2015.

In 2015, Milova joined the Burn the Floor cruise tour.

Dancing with the Stars

Turkey (Yok Böyle Dans)

In 2011, Milova was announced as one of the professional dancers for Yok Böyle Dans, the Turkish version of Dancing with the Stars. Milova was paired with soccer player Pascal Nouma. They reached the final of the competition finishing in second place.

In 2012, Milova returned for the second, and final, season of Yok Böyle Dans. She was paired with Survivor Turkey contestant, Aydın Gülşen. They reached the fifth week of the competition before being eliminated, finishing in twelfth place.

Ireland 

In 2017, Milova was announced as one of the professional dancers for the first series of Dancing with the Stars. She was partnered with Kerry footballer, Aidan O'Mahony. On the 26 March 2017, O'Mahony and Milova were crowned the first ever champions of the series.

In 2018, Milova was partnered with comedian, actor and RTÉ 2FM presenter, Bernard O'Shea. They reached the seventh week of the competition, finishing in eighth place.

In 2019, Milova was partnered with Dublin footballer, Denis Bastick. They reached the ninth week of the competition, finishing in sixth place.

Highest and Lowest Scoring Per Dance

1 These scores was awarded during Switch-Up Week.

Series 1 

 Celebrity partner
 Aidan O'Mahony; Average: 21.6; Place: 1st

Series 2 

 Celebrity partner
 Bernard O'Shea; Average: 14.2; Place: 8th

Series 3 

 Celebrity partner
 Denis Bastick; Average: 19.6; Place: 6th

Personal life 
Milova is married to dancer and fellow-Dancing with the Stars cast member, Vitali Kozmin. They have a two children together, a son, Konstantin and a daughter, Kira.

Milova's sister, Alika Milova, is a singer and winner of the Estonian version of Pop Idol - Eesti otsib superstaari and Estonia's Eurovision Song Contest 2023 entry.

References 

1988 births
Living people
People from Narva
Estonian people of Russian descent
Ballroom dancers